The team relay competition at the 2020 FIL European Luge Championships was held on 19 January 2020.

Results
The event was started at 13:00.

References

Team relay